The 1989 IBF World Championships were held in Jakarta, Indonesia, in 1989. Below are the results of the men's singles.

Main stage

Section 1

Section 2

Section 3

Section 4

Section 5

Section 6

Section 7

Section 8

Final stage

External links 
 Results

1989 IBF World Championships